is the key bus terminal located in central Hiroshima.

History
Hiroshima Bus terminal opened on July 29, 1957, with bus stops around Kamiya-cho, Hiroshima.  The current "Bus Center" opened in October 1974 as a part of "Hiroshima Center Buildings" together with Sogo and AQ'A Hiroshima Center City.  "Hiroshima Bus Center" is on the 3rd floor.  "Hiroshima Bus Center" and "AQ'A Hiroshima Center City" are operated by Hiroshima Bus Center Co.,Ltd.

Terminals
11 Departures
9 Arrivals

Bus routes

Intercity express bus

Hiroshima Airport Limousine bus

Hiroshima Prefecture Internal express bus

Suburban bus

Local bus
Hiroden Bus
Chugoku JR Bus
Hiroshima Bus
Geiyo Bus
Hiroshima Kotsu

Connections
Astram Line
Hiroden Main Line
Hiroden Ujina Line

See also

AQ'A Hiroshima Center City
Sogo
Motomachi Cred
Kamiya-cho Shareo
Hiroshima Central City Library

External links
Hiroshima Bus Center

Bus stations in Japan
Buildings and structures in Hiroshima
Transport in Hiroshima Prefecture
Transport infrastructure completed in 1957
1957 establishments in Japan